Paspalum is a genus of plants in the grass family.

The group is widespread across much of Asia, Africa, Australia, and the Americas. Commonly known as paspalum, bahiagrasses, crowngrasses or dallis grasses, many of the species are tall perennial New World grasses. They are warm-season C4 grasses and are most diverse in subtropical and tropical regions.

Paspalum scrobiculatum (koda, varuka, varuku, etc.) is a millet locally grown as food grain. Some species, such as bahiagrass (P. notatum) and P. nicorae, are grown for pasturage, especially with the perennial forage peanut (Arachis glabrata) as a companion crop. Bahiagrass has also some significance as a honey plant.

Water finger-grass (P. vaginatum) resembles bermudagrass (Cynodon dactylon), but has a higher salinity tolerance and can consume greywater. It is not infrequently used for arena and golf course turf in warmer coastal regions, such as Baja California, Florida, Peru, Texas and Venezuela. Dedicated paspalum cultivars such as 'Aloha Seashore' or 'Platinum TE' have been produced for such uses.

Paspalums are also food for caterpillars of lepidopterans such as the pasture day moth (Apina callisto), and those of the dark palm dart (Telicota ancilla) which feed on P. urvillei. Granivorous birds often eat paspalum seeds; the chestnut-breasted munia (Lonchura castaneothorax) readily feeds on the seeds of  P. longifolium, for example.

The ergot Claviceps paspali is a sac fungus that grows on Paspalum, producing ergot alkaloids and the tremorgen paspalitrem; it causes "paspalum staggers" poisoning in cattle.

Tussock paspalum (P. quadrifarium) is considered a weed in Australia.

Minute Maid Park the home ballpark of the Houston Astros has Platinum TE Paspalum as its field surface.

Selected species

 Paspalum azuayense
 Paspalum arundinaceum
 Paspalum bakeri
 Paspalum batianoffii
 Paspalum blodgettii
 Paspalum boscianum
 Paspalum caespitosum
 Paspalum ceresia
 Paspalum clavuliferum
 Paspalum conjugatum P.J.Bergius – carabao grass, hilo grass
 Paspalum convexum
 Paspalum decumbens
 Paspalum densum
 Paspalum dilatatum – dallis grass
 Paspalum dispar
 Paspalum distichum
 Paspalum fasciculatum
 Paspalum fimbriatum
 Paspalum floridanum
 Paspalum fluitans
 Paspalum geminatum
 Paspalum longifolium
 Paspalum laeve Michx. – smooth paspalum
 Paspalum laxum
 Paspalum longifolium
 Paspalum longum
 Paspalum macrophyllum
 Paspalum mandiocanum 
 Paspalum maritimum
 Paspalum millegrana
 Paspalum minus
 Paspalum molle
 Paspalum nicorae
 Paspalum notatum – bahiagrass, Pensacola bahiagrass
 Paspalum orbiculare G.Forst.
 Paspalum orbiculatum Poir.
 Paspalum paniculatum L.
 Paspalum parviflorum
 Paspalum paucispicatum
 Paspalum peckii
 Paspalum pleostachyum
 Paspalum plicatulum – brownseed paspalum
 Paspalum pulchellum
 Paspalum pubiflorum
 Paspalum quadrifarium – tussock paspalum
 Paspalum repens
 Paspalum rugulosum
 Paspalum rupestre
 Paspalum schesslii
 Paspalum scrobiculatum – koda millet, kodo millet, kodra millet, varuka (Sanskrit), varuku (Tamil)
 Paspalum secans
 Paspalum setaceum – slender paspalum
 Paspalum soboliferum
 Paspalum urvillei
 Paspalum vaginatum Sw. (syn. P. distichum, P. littorale) – water finger-grass
 Paspalum virgatum
 Paspalum wullschlaegelii

Formerly placed here
 Axonopus compressus (broad-leaved carpetgrass), as P. compressum, P. platycaule, P. platycaulon
 Axonopus fissifolius (narrow-leaved carpetgrass), as P. fissifolium
 Digitaria exilis (fonio), as P. exile

References

  (2008): Noxious Weed List for Australian States and Territories. Version 18.00, September 2008. PDF fulltext

 
Poaceae genera
Taxa named by Carl Linnaeus